In Ohio, State Route 102 may refer to:
Ohio State Route 102 (1923), now SR 51
Ohio State Route 102 (1940s), now SR 120